The Journal of Palestine Studies (JPS) is a quarterly peer-reviewed academic journal established in 1971. It is published by Taylor and Francis on behalf of the Institute for Palestine Studies, having previously been published by the University of California Press. The editors-in-chief are Rashid Khalidi (Columbia University) and Sherene Seikaly (UC Santa Barbara). The journal covers Palestinian affairs and the Arab–Israeli conflict.

Abstracting and indexing
JPS is abstracted and indexed in Scopus and the Social Sciences Citation Index. According to the Journal Citation Reports, the journal has a 2017 impact factor of 0.179.

See also

Arab Studies Quarterly
List of University of California Press journals

References

External links

1971 establishments in the United States
Middle Eastern studies journals
English-language journals
Palestine (region)
Publications established in 1971
Quarterly journals
University of California Press academic journals